Hofheimer is a surname. Notable people with the surname include:

 Meister Pauls Hoffheimer, a.k.a. Paul Hofhaimer, Paulus Hofhaymer etc. (1459–1537), Austrian composer
 Aline Rhonie Hofheimer (1909–1963), American aviator
 Charlie Hofheimer (born 1981), American film, television and theatre actor
 Grace Hofheimer (1891–1965), American pianist

See also
 Hofheimer's, American retail company, now defunct